Omar Arellano Nuño (born 29 May 1967) is a Mexican former professional footballer who played as a midfielder and current manager. He played for Tigres UANL during the 1995-96 season.

As of April 2009 he was the manager at Chivas Guadalajara, and he managed Necaxa in 2010.

References

External links

1967 births
Living people
Footballers from Tamaulipas
Association football midfielders
Mexican footballers
Mexico international footballers
C.D. Guadalajara footballers
Tigres UANL footballers
Club León footballers
C.F. Pachuca players
Mexican football managers
C.D. Guadalajara managers
Club Necaxa managers
C.D. Veracruz managers
Correcaminos UAT managers